The 2019–20 SuperLiga (also known as the CEC Bank SuperLiga for sponsorship reasons) is the 106th season of premier club rugby in Romania. Starting with this edition, the number of participating teams has decreased from eight teams to seven, due to CSM București dissolving before the start of the new season. At the end of April, Gloria Buzău announced that their senior team have dissolved due to financial issues concerning the COVID-19 pandemic leaving only 6 teams remaining in the SuperLiga for the remainder of the season. During August 2020, it was announced that Timișoara Saracens RCM UVT will restart in the SuperLiga under the new name of SCM Timișoara Rugby.

Teams

Personnel and kits
Note: Flags indicate national union as has been defined under WR eligibility rules. Players may hold more than one non-WR nationality

Table
This is the regular season league table:

 

 Note – Due to financial complications caused by the ongoing COVID-19 pandemic, Gloria Buzău have dissolved halfway through the season therefore giving their final play-off spot to Tomitanii Constanța

Fixtures & Results

Round 1

Round 2

Round 3

Round 4

Round 5

Round 6

Round 7

Round 8

Round 9

Round 10

Round 11

Round 12

Round 13

Round 14

Play-off Semifinals
The play-off semifinals were held on 29 August 2020 at 15:30 Eastern European Time and 30 August 2020 at 15:30 Eastern European Time respectively at Stadionul Noua din Brașov.

Semifinals
The semi-finals were held on 5 September 2020 at 15:30 Eastern European Time and 6 September 2020 Eastern European Time at 15:30 at Stadionul Stadionul Lascăr Ghineț and Stadionul Ghencea II respectively.

Finals
 Fifth/Sixth place final
The Fifth/Sixth place final was held on 5 September 2020 at 10:00 Eastern European Time at Stadionul Iuliu Hațieganu, 6 days after the semi-final play-offs were held

 Third/Fourth place final
The Third/Fourth place final was held on 12 September 2020 at 10;00 Eastern European Time at Stadionul Noua din Brașov, 1 week and 6 days after the semi-finals were held.

 First/Second place final
The First/Second place final was held on 12 September 2020 at 15:30 Eastern European Time at Stadionul Noua din Brașov, 1 week and 6 days after the semi-finals were held.

External links
 www.super-liga.ro – Official website

References

SuperLiga (rugby)
2019–20 in European rugby union leagues
2019–20 in Romanian rugby union